Pettit Creek is a stream in Bartow County, Georgia.

Pettit was the name of a local Cherokee landowner.

See also
List of rivers of Georgia (U.S. state)

References

Rivers of Bartow County, Georgia
Rivers of Georgia (U.S. state)